Clappersgate is a village in the South Lakeland district, in the county of Cumbria, England. Clappersgate is located on the B5286 road and on the River Brathay. It is near the town of Ambleside.

References 

 english-lakes.com

Villages in Cumbria
South Lakeland District